Antony Francis Hignell (6 July 1928 – 23 October 2015) was an English cricketer and javelin thrower.

Cricket career
He was a right-handed batsman and right-arm medium-pace bowler who played for Gloucestershire. He was born in Kroonstad.

Hignell made a single first-class appearance for the team, during the 1947 season, against Cambridge University. He scored 7 runs in the only innings in which he batted, and conceded 48 runs with the ball in 18 overs.

Hignell played for Gloucestershire Second XI in the Minor Counties Championship during the 1948 season.

Athletics career
In 1949 he was AAA champion in the javelin event, and represented England in 1950 where he placed fourth at the British Empire Games in Auckland.

Personal life
He was the father of Alastair Hignell, who played cricket for Cambridge University and Gloucestershire and rugby union for England, Cambridge University and Bristol.

Hignell died on 23 October 2015 at the age of 87.

References

1928 births
2015 deaths
People from Kroonstad
English cricketers
Gloucestershire cricketers
English male javelin throwers
Commonwealth Games competitors for England
Athletes (track and field) at the 1950 British Empire Games